Ruslan Nailevich Zhiganshin (born 25 September 1992) is a retired Russian ice dancer. With partner Elena Ilinykh, he is the 2015 Russian national champion.

With former partner Victoria Sinitsina, he is the 2012 World Junior champion and won bronze medals at the 2013 Winter Universiade, 2012 Rostelecom Cup, and 2014 Russian Championships. They placed seventh at the 2014 World Championships.

Personal life 
Ruslan Zhiganshin was born on 25 September 1992 in Moscow. He is the brother of Nelli Zhiganshina, a competitive ice dancer for Germany.

Early years on the ice 
Zhiganshin became interested in skating after his mother took him along to his sister's practices. Having taken up ice dancing at age nine, he had one partner before becoming partnerless for a year.

Partnership with Sinitsina 
Zhiganshin and Victoria Sinitsina met in a group led by Irina Lobacheva and Ilia Averbukh but soon joined Elena Kustarova and Svetlana Alexeeva. They trained mostly in Moscow. From 2010 to 2012, they also went to summer training camps in Ventspils, Latvia.

Junior 
Sinitsina/Zhiganshin debuted on the Junior Grand Prix circuit at the 2008 Merano Cup where they finished sixth. The following JGP season, they placed fifth at both of their events.

They won a pair of silver medals during the 2010–11 JGP season and qualified for the JGP Final. At the Final, they won the short dance and placed second in the free dance to take the silver behind Ksenia Monko / Kirill Khaliavin. They withdrew from the 2011 Russian Junior Championships due to Sinitsina's illness.

In the 2011–12 season, Sinitsina/Zhiganshin won gold at the Junior Grand Prix event in Poland, their first JGP title. They won another title in Austria to qualify for their second JGP Final. At the Junior Grand Prix Final, they placed first in both segments and won the title. They then took gold at the 2012 Russian Junior Championships. Sinitsina/Zhiganshin won the 2012 World Junior title. They were first in both the short and free dance and scored their season's best, 153.81 points.

Senior 
In the 2012–13 season, Sinitsina/Zhiganshin debuted on the senior Grand Prix series. After finishing 6th at the 2012 Cup of China, they then won their first senior GP medal, bronze, at the 2012 Rostelecom Cup. The duo finished 5th in their senior national debut at the 2013 Russian Championships.

In 2013–14, Sinitsina/Zhiganshin started their season at the Ice Star in Minsk, Belarus, winning the silver medal behind Bobrova/Soloviev. At their sole Grand Prix assignment, the 2013 NHK Trophy, they had a bad fall while practicing a lift. They finished eighth at the event. After taking the bronze medal at the 2013 Winter Universiade in Trentino, Italy, they stepped onto the senior national podium for the first time at the 2014 Russian Championships. Competing against Riazanova/Tkachenko for Russia's third Olympic spot, Sinitsina/Zhiganshin finished ahead at nationals and then at the 2014 European Championships in Budapest. They came in fourth at the latter event, their senior ISU Championship debut.

Along with Ilinykh/Katsalapov and Bobrova/Soloviev, Sinitsina/Zhiganshin were selected to represent Russia at the Winter Olympics, held in February 2014 in Sochi. They finished 16th at the Olympics, behind a number of teams they had surpassed at Europeans, but rebounded the next month at the 2014 World Championships. They placed eighth in both segments and finished seventh overall in Saitama, Japan. In early April 2014, Sinitsina left to skate with Nikita Katsalapov.

Partnership with Ilinykh 
Soon after, in early April 2014, Zhiganshin's coaches invited Katsalapov's former partner, Elena Ilinykh, to try out with their student. Coached by Elena Kustarova in Moscow, Ilinykh/Zhiganshin began training together in an unofficial partnership — the Russian federation having decided to give Ilinykh/Katsalapov time to reconcile — and received approval at the end of May.

2014–15 season
For the 2014–15 Grand Prix season, Ilinykh/Zhiganshin were assigned to Cup of China and Rostelecom Cup. Making their international debut, they placed fourth at Cup of China and then won the silver medal behind Americans Madison Chock / Evan Bates at Rostelecom Cup. They qualified for the Grand Prix Final in their first season as a team. At the GPF in Barcelona, they placed sixth in the short dance, fourth in the free dance, and sixth overall. At the 2015 Russian Championships, Ilinykh/Ziganshin won their first national title.

2015–16 season
Ilinykh/Zhiganshin began their season at the Mordovian Ornament, which they won with new personal bests in all segments. For the 2015–16 Grand Prix season, they were once again assigned to Cup of China and Rostelecom Cup. They won the bronze at Cup of China behind Italians Anna Cappellini / Luca Lanotte and Americans Madison Chock / Evan Bates. Their next competition they finished 5th at the 2015 Rostelecom Cup. On December 24-27, Ilinykh/Zhiganshin competed at the 2016 Russian Championships, where they finished 4th behind Alexandra Stepanova / Ivan Bukin after placing fourth in the short dance and second in the free dance.

Ilinykh/Zhiganshin decided to fly to Michigan on 27 February 2016 to work with Igor Shpilband.

2016–17 season 
They finished fourth at the 2017 Russian Championships, losing the bronze to Sinisina/Katsalapov by 0.17. They had a one-point deduction after part of their costume fell onto the ice.

Zhiganshin decided to retire from competition due to a spinal injury.

Programs

With Ilinykh

With Sinitsina

Competitive highlights 
GP: Grand Prix; CS: Challenger Series; JGP: Junior Grand Prix

With Ilinykh

With Sinitsina

Detailed results 
Small medals for short and free programs awarded only at ISU Championships.

With Ilinykh

With Sinitsina

References

External links 

 
 

Russian male ice dancers
1992 births
Living people
Figure skaters from Moscow
World Junior Figure Skating Championships medalists
Figure skaters at the 2014 Winter Olympics
Olympic figure skaters of Russia
Tatar people of Russia
Universiade medalists in figure skating
Universiade bronze medalists for Russia
Competitors at the 2013 Winter Universiade